John Philip II of Salm-Dhaun (28 October 1645 – 26 June 1693) was Rhinegrave of Salm-Dhaun from 1673 until his death.  He was the son of Count John Louis of Salm-Dhaun and his wife, Elisabeth of Salm-Neufville.

He married Anna Catherine, the daughter of John Louis, Count of Nassau-Ottweiler and Countess Palatine Dorothea Catherine of Birkenfeld-Bischweiler.  They had seven children:
 Louis Philip (b. 1672)
 Sophia Dorothea (b. 1674)
 Charles (b. 1675)
 Philip Magnus (d. 1679)
 Christian Otto (d. 1680)
 Walrad (d. 1686)
 Ludovica Catharina (b. 1687)

John Philip II was born and died in Hochstetten-Dhaun.

External links 
 Counts of Salm-Dhaun

Counts of Salm
1645 births
1693 deaths
Salm family
17th-century German people